The following list of nicknames of blues musicians complements the existing list of blues musicians by referring to their nicknames, stage names and pseudonyms, thereby helping to clarify possible confusion arising over artists with similar or the same nicknames. The list is arranged in alphabetical order by nickname rather than surname. For the possible origins of the nickname, see the corresponding article.

B 
Baby Tate
Backwards Sam Firk
Barbecue Bob
Barkin' Bill Smith
Barrelhouse Chuck
B.B. King
Big Bill Broonzy
Arthur "Big Boy" Crudup
Willie "Big Eyes" Smith
Big Joe Duskin
Big Joe Turner
Big Maceo Merriweather
Big Mama Thornton
Johnny "Big Moose" Walker
Big Walter Horton
Golden "Big" Wheeler
Otis "Big Smokey" Smothers
Black Ace
Blind Blake
Blind Boy Fuller
Blind Boy Grunt (Bob Dylan)
Blind Gary Davis (Reverend Gary Davis)
Blind Joe Reynolds
Blind Lemon Jefferson
Blind Mississippi Morris
Blind Willie Johnson
Blind Willie McTell
Bob Log III
Bo Carter
Bo Diddley
Kenny "Blues Boss" Wayne
Boogie Bill Webb
Boogie Woogie Red
Brownie McGhee
Buddy Guy
Bukka White
Bull City Red
Bumble Bee Slim
Buster Benton
Buster Pickens

C 
Catfish Keith
Champion Jack Dupree
Eddie "Cleanhead" Vinson
Cow Cow Davenport
Cripple Clarence Lofton
Curley Weaver

D 
Detroit Gary Wiggins
Drive 'Em Down (pianist Willie Hall)

E 
Eddie "Guitar" Burns

F 
Fiddlin' Joe Martin
Frank "Springback" James
Furry Lewis

G 
Gary B.B. Coleman
Clarence "Gatemouth" Brown
George "Mojo" Buford
Georgia Tom (Thomas A. Dorsey)
Guitar Slim

H 
Harmonica Shah
H-Bomb Ferguson
Hip Linkchain
Hollywood Fats
David Honeyboy Edwards
Hound Dog Taylor
Howlin' Wolf

I 
Ironing Board Sam
Ivory Joe Hunter

J 
Jaybird Coleman
Jazz Gillum
Jelly Roll Morton
Johnny Drummer
Junior Wells

K 
Kansas Joe McCoy
Keb' Mo'
Kid Memphis
King Solomon Hill, a nickname and pseudonym
Koko Taylor

L 
Laughing Charley
Lazy Lester
Lead Belly
Lightnin' Hopkins
Lil' Ed Williams
Little Brother Montgomery
Little Freddie King
Little Hatch
Little Mack Simmons
Little Milton
Little Smokey Smothers
Little Sonny
Little Sun Glover
Little Victor
Little Walter
Little Willie Littlefield
Lonesome Sundown
Louisiana Red
Lovie Austin

M 
Ma Rainey
Magic Sam
Magic Slim
Mamie Smith
Mance Lipscomb
Maxwell Street Jimmy Davis
Memphis Minnie
Memphis Slim
Mighty Joe Young
Mississippi John Hurt
Mississippi Fred McDowell
Mr. Blues (Wynonie Harris)
Muddy Waters

P 
Papa Charlie Jackson
Papa Charlie McCoy
Paul "Wine" Jones
Peetie Wheatstraw (also released music under the names "The Devil's Son-in-Law" and "The High Sheriff from Hell")
Pee Wee Crayton
Peg Leg Howell
Peg Leg Sam
Piano Red
Huey "Piano" Smith
Pinetop Perkins
Pinetop Smith
Pink Anderson
Pops Staples
Popa Chubby

R 
Richard "Rabbit" Brown
Ramblin' Thomas
Reverend Gary Davis
Robert Nighthawk
Rockin' Sidney

S 
Scrapper Blackwell
Seasick Steve 
Shakey Jake Harris
Sippie Wallace
Skip James
Sleepy John Estes
Slim Harpo
Eric "Slowhand" Clapton
Smokey Hogg
Smokey Wilson
Smokin' Joe Bonamassa
Smoky Babe
Dave "Snaker" Ray
Soko Richardson
Son House
Sonny Terry
Sonny Boy Williamson I 
Sonny Boy Williamson II
Spider John Koerner
St. Louis Jimmy Oden
Sugar Ray Norcia
Sunnyland Slim

T 
Tab Smith
Tabby Thomas
Taj Mahal
Tampa Red
T-Bone Walker
T-Model Ford
Alger "Texas" Alexander
Tommy Tucker

U
U.P. Wilson

W 
Washboard Sam
Washboard Willie
Watermelon Slim
Whistlin' Alex Moore
Moses "Whispering" Smith

See also 

Lists of nicknames – nickname list articles on Wikipedia
List of stage names
List of nicknames of jazz musicians

Blues musicians
 
Blues
Blues musicians